Rustam Orujov (born 4 October 1991) is an Azerbaijani judoka. He competed in the men's 73 kg event at the 2012 Summer Olympics; after defeating Gideon van Zyl in the second round, he was eliminated by Mansur Isaev in the third round. He won the silver medal in the men's 73 kg event at the 2016 Summer Olympics.

Biography
Rustam Orujov, was born October 4, 1991, in Russia, in the city of Ust-Ilimsk Irkutsk Region. At the age of  seven  he began to practice judo. He lived in the Irkutsk region until he was 16. He competed  in various youth competitions. After moving to Baku, he began training in the famous "Attila" martial arts sports club. At youth level he won the championship of Eurasia, but failed to win the continental championship. Later, Orujov went to the senior level, in which initially competed in 66 kg weight category. The first success at senior level came after Rustam Orujov began to contest at 73 kg weight category.

In June 2011, the European Cup in the Slovenian city of Celje Orujov finished second, in October of the same year at the World Cup in Baku, where Orujov first started performing in weight up to 73 kg, –  third. In February 2012, Orujov was fifth at the Grand Prix in Düsseldorf. That tournament,  allowed him to score points for the Olympic license and Orujov was able to get through to the Olympics only through the continental quota of the European Judo Union. In May 2012 at the Grand Prix Baku Orujov has won first place.

On the 2012 Olympic Games in London in 1/16 Orujov won against Gideon van Zyl from South Africa, but lost to the future champion of the games Mansur Isaev of Russia.

In 2013, when Rustam Orujov returned from the Azerbaijani mandatory military service, he performed at the Grand Prix of Samsun, in which he was defeated due to lack of appropriate training. But in May 2013, Orujov was able to recover and became the winner of the tournament "Grand Slam", which was held in Baku. In 2014, at the next Grand Prix tournament in Samsun Orujov won the silver medal.

In 2015, at the Grand Prix in Georgia, Orujov won the gold medal. In 2016 he became the champion of Europe. Representing Azerbaijan at the 2016 Summer Olympics in Rio de Janeiro, where he won a silver medal in judo in the weight category up to 73 kg. September 1 decree of the President of Azerbaijan was awarded the Order "For Service to the Fatherland III degree."

In the -73 kg weight category he won silver at the 2017 and 2019 World Championships.  He also won bronze medals at the 2017, 2020 and 2022 European Championships, and a silver at the 2019 European Games.  He had to miss the 2021 European Championships due to COVID.

References

External links

 
 
 
 

1991 births
Living people
Azerbaijani male judoka
Olympic judoka of Azerbaijan
Judoka at the 2012 Summer Olympics
Judoka at the 2016 Summer Olympics
Medalists at the 2016 Summer Olympics
Olympic medalists in judo
Olympic silver medalists for Azerbaijan
People from Ust-Ilimsk
Judoka at the 2015 European Games
Judoka at the 2019 European Games
European Games medalists in judo
European Games silver medalists for Azerbaijan
Judoka at the 2020 Summer Olympics
21st-century Azerbaijani people
20th-century Azerbaijani people